The 1988-89 Cleveland Cavaliers season was the 19th season of NBA basketball in Cleveland, Ohio. During the off-season, the team signed free agent Tree Rollins, and acquired Darnell Valentine from the expansion Miami Heat. The Cavaliers started their season with a 133–93 road win over the expansion Charlotte Hornets on November 4, 1988, which was the Hornets' first game in franchise history, then posted an 11-game winning streak between December and January, which led to a successful 24–5 start, held a 35–11 record at the All-Star break, and finished the season with a 57–25 record, setting a franchise high. This record was tied for 2nd best in the NBA, finishing 2nd in the Central Division.

Mark Price and Brad Daugherty both led the team in scoring with 18.9 points per game each, while Price contributed 8.4 assists and 1.5 steals per game, while being selected to the All-NBA Third Team, and Daugherty averaged 9.2 rebounds per game. In addition, Ron Harper averaged 18.6 points, 5.0 rebounds, 5.3 assists and 2.3 steals per game, while Larry Nance provided the team with 17.2 points, 8.0 rebounds and 2.8 blocks per game, and was named to the NBA All-Defensive First Team, and sixth man Hot Rod Williams contributed 11.6 points, 5.8 rebounds and 1.6 blocks per game off the bench. Mike Sanders provided with 9.3 points per game, and Craig Ehlo contributed 7.4 points and 1.3 steals per game off the bench. 

Price, Daugherty and Nance were all selected for the 1989 NBA All-Star Game, with head coach Lenny Wilkens coaching the Eastern Conference; however, Harper was not selected for the All-Star Game. Price also finished in tenth place in Most Valuable Player voting, and Wilkens finished in third place in Coach of the Year voting.

In the Eastern Conference First Round of the playoffs, the Cavaliers were eliminated by Michael Jordan's 6th-seeded Chicago Bulls in five games, thanks to a memorable series-clinching shot by Jordan.

Key Dates:

Draft picks

 1st round pick (#14) traded to Phoenix in Larry Nance deal. Used to draft Dan Majerle.
 2nd round pick (#38) traded to Phoenix in Larry Nance deal. Used to draft Dean Garrett.

Roster

Regular season

Season standings

Notes
 z, y – division champions
 x – clinched playoff spot

Record vs. opponents

Game log

|- style="background:#cfc;"
| 1 || November 4, 1988 || @ Charlotte
|- style="background:#cfc;"
| 2 || November 5, 1988 || @ Indiana
|- style="background:#cfc;"
| 3 || November 9, 1988 || L.A. Clippers
|- style="background:#cfc;"
| 4 || November 12, 1988 || Indiana
|- style="background:#fcc;"
| 5 || November 15, 19888:00 pm EST || Atlanta
| L 95–97
| Daugherty (22)
| Williams (11)
| Price (10)
| Richfield Coliseum15,684
| 4–1
|- style="background:#cfc;"
| 6 || November 18, 1988 || @ New Jersey
|- style="background:#cfc;"
| 7 || November 19, 1988 || Milwaukee
|- style="background:#cfc;"
| 8 || November 22, 1988 || @ Boston(at Hartford, CT)
|- style="background:#fcc;"
| 9 || November 23, 1988 || @ Philadelphia
|- style="background:#fcc;"
| 10 || November 26, 1988 || @ New York
|- style="background:#cfc;"
| 11 || November 27, 1988 || Miami

|- style="background:#cfc;"
| 12 || December 1, 1988 || @ Milwaukee
|- style="background:#cfc;"
| 13 || December 2, 1988 || Boston
|- style="background:#cfc;"
| 14 || December 4, 1988 || Denver
|- style="background:#fcc;"
| 15 || December 6, 1988 || @ Houston
|- style="background:#cfc;"
| 16 || December 8, 1988 || @ San Antonio
|- style="background:#cfc;"
| 17 || December 10, 1988 || @ Dallas
|- style="background:#fcc;"
| 18 || December 13, 1988 || L.A. Lakers
|- style="background:#cfc;"
| 19 || December 15, 1988 || Detroit
|- style="background:#cfc;"
| 20 || December 17, 19887:30 pm EST || Atlanta
| W 120–94
| Price (23)
| Daugherty,Harper (9)
| Price (8)
| Richfield Coliseum18,815
| 15–5
|- style="background:#cfc;"
| 21 || December 20, 1988 || Utah
|- style="background:#cfc;"
| 22 || December 21, 1988 || @ Boston
|- style="background:#cfc;"
| 23 || December 23, 1988 || Seattle
|- style="background:#cfc;"
| 24 || December 27, 1988 || @ Chicago
|- style="background:#cfc;"
| 25 || December 28, 1988 || Charlotte
|- style="background:#cfc;"
| 26 || December 30, 1988 || Washington

|- style="background:#cfc;"
| 27 || January 3, 1989 || Indiana
|- style="background:#cfc;"
| 28 || January 5, 1989 || Chicago
|- style="background:#cfc;"
| 29 || January 7, 1989 || New York
|- style="background:#fcc;"
| 30 || January 9, 1989 || @ Seattle
|- style="background:#cfc;"
| 31 || January 11, 1989 || @ Phoenix
|- style="background:#fcc;"
| 32 || January 13, 1989 || @ L.A. Lakers
|- style="background:#cfc;"
| 33 || January 14, 1989 || @ Denver
|- style="background:#cfc;"
| 34 || January 16, 1989 || Phoenix
|- style="background:#cfc;"
| 35 || January 19, 1989 || @ Indiana
|- style="background:#cfc;"
| 36 || January 21, 1989 || New Jersey
|- style="background:#cfc;"
| 37 || January 23, 1989 || Golden State
|- style="background:#fcc;"
| 38 || January 24, 19897:30 pm EST || @ Atlanta
| L 105–121
| Nance (28)
| Daugherty (9)
| Price (9)
| The Omni16,371
| 30–8
|- style="background:#cfc;"
| 39 || January 27, 1989 || @ Detroit
|- style="background:#fcc;"
| 40 || January 29, 1989 || @ Washington(at Baltimore, MD)
|- style="background:#cfc;"
| 41 || January 31, 1989 || Philadelphia

|- style="background:#fcc;"
| 42 || February 2, 1989 || @ New York
|- style="background:#cfc;"
| 43 || February 3, 1989 || Sacramento
|- style="background:#cfc;"
| 44 || February 5, 1989 || @ Charlotte
|- style="background:#fcc;"
| 45 || February 7, 1989 || @ Milwaukee
|- style="background:#cfc;"
| 46 || February 9, 1989 || Indiana
|- style="text-align:center;"
| colspan="9" style="background:#bbcaff;"|All-Star Break
|- style="background:#cfc;"
| 47 || February 14, 1989 || @ Miami
|- style="background:#cfc;"
| 48 || February 15, 1989 || New York
|- style="background:#fcc;"
| 49 || February 17, 19898:00 pm EST || @ Atlanta
| L 100–108
| Price (29)
| Daugherty (13)
| Harper (5)
| The Omni16,371
| 37–12
|- style="background:#cfc;"
| 50 || February 18, 1989 || Philadelphia
|- style="background:#cfc;"
| 51 || February 20, 1989 || Houston
|- style="background:#cfc;"
| 52 || February 22, 1989 || New Jersey
|- style="background:#cfc;"
| 53 || February 24, 1989 || Portland
|- style="background:#cfc;"
| 54 || February 28, 1989 || Detroit

|- style="background:#cfc;"
| 55 || March 2, 1989 || San Antonio
|- style="background:#fcc;"
| 56 || March 3, 1989 || @ Detroit
|- style="background:#fcc;"
| 57 || March 5, 1989 || Milwaukee
|- style="background:#cfc;"
| 58 || March 7, 1989 || @ Sacramento
|- style="background:#fcc;"
| 59 || March 9, 1989 || @ Golden State
|- style="background:#fcc;"
| 60 || March 10, 1989 || @ L.A. Clippers
|- style="background:#cfc;"
| 61 || March 12, 1989 || @ Portland
|- style="background:#fcc;"
| 62 || March 13, 1989 || @ Utah
|- style="background:#cfc;"
| 63 || March 15, 1989 || Chicago
|- style="background:#cfc;"
| 64 || March 19, 1989 || @ New Jersey
|- style="background:#cfc;"
| 65 || March 20, 1989 || Washington
|- style="background:#fcc;"
| 66 || March 22, 1989 || @ Philadelphia
|- style="background:#cfc;"
| 67 || March 23, 1989 || Milwaukee
|- style="background:#fcc;"
| 68 || March 25, 1989 || @ Milwaukee
|- style="background:#fcc;"
| 69 || March 27, 1989 || @ Indiana
|- style="background:#cfc;"
| 70 || March 28, 1989 || Dallas
|- style="background:#cfc;"
| 71 || March 31, 1989 || @ Chicago

|- style="background:#cfc;"
| 72 || April 2, 1989 || Boston
|- style="background:#cfc;"
| 73 || April 4, 19897:30 pm EDT || Atlanta
| W 105–91
| Harper (32)
| Daugherty (17)
| Price (13)
| Richfield Coliseum19,322
| 53–20
|- style="background:#fcc;"
| 74 || April 7, 1989 || @ Washington
|- style="background:#cfc;"
| 75 || April 9, 1989 || Charlotte
|- style="background:#cfc;"
| 76 || April 11, 1989 || Philadelphia
|- style="background:#fcc;"
| 77 || April 12, 1989 || @ Detroit
|- style="background:#fcc;"
| 78 || April 14, 1989 || @ Boston
|- style="background:#cfc;"
| 79 || April 16, 1989 || Chicago
|- style="background:#fcc;"
| 80 || April 18, 1989 || Detroit
|- style="background:#fcc;"
| 81 || April 21, 19897:30 pm EDT || @ Atlanta
| L 89–92
| Harper (18)
| Harper,Rollins (8)
| Ehlo (8)
| The Omni16,371
| 56–25
|- style="background:#cfc;"
| 82 || April 23, 1989 || @ Chicago

Playoffs

|- align="center" bgcolor="#ffcccc"
| 1
| April 28
| Chicago
| L 88–95
| Craig Ehlo (19)
| Brad Daugherty (7)
| Darnell Valentine (6)
| Richfield Coliseum19,312
| 0–1
|- align="center" bgcolor="#ccffcc"
| 2
| April 30
| Chicago
| W 96–88
| Ron Harper (31)
| Ron Harper (11)
| Larry Nance (5)
| Richfield Coliseum20,273
| 1–1
|- align="center" bgcolor="#ffcccc"
| 3
| May 3
| @ Chicago
| L 94–101
| Hot Rod Williams (22)
| Hot Rod Williams (11)
| Darnell Valentine (8)
| Chicago Stadium17,721
| 1–2
|- align="center" bgcolor="#ccffcc"
| 4
| May 5
| @ Chicago
| W 108–105 (OT)
| Larry Nance (27)
| Brad Daugherty (17)
| Mark Price (7)
| Chicago Stadium18,264
| 2–2
|- align="center" bgcolor="#ffcccc"
| 5
| May 7
| Chicago
| L 100–101
| Craig Ehlo (24)
| Brad Daugherty (11)
| Mark Price (7)
| Richfield Coliseum20,273
| 2–3

Player stats

Regular season

Playoffs

Player Statistics Citation:

Awards and records

Awards
 Mark Price, All-NBA Third Team
 Larry Nance, NBA All-Defensive First Team

Records

Milestones

All-Star

Transactions

Trades

Free agents

Development league

References

 Cleveland Cavaliers on Database Basketball
 Cleveland Cavaliers on Basketball Reference

Cleveland Cavaliers seasons
Cleveland
Cleveland